Dmitry Sergeyevich Golubov (born 14 June 1985) is a Russian former professional footballer.

Career
Golubov made his debut in the Russian Premier League in 2005 for FC Moscow.

Golubov signed for FC Aktobe in June 2016, leaving the club a couple of months later.

References

1985 births
Sportspeople from Stavropol
Russian footballers
Russia youth international footballers
Russia under-21 international footballers
FC Tekstilshchik Kamyshin players
FC Moscow players
FC Torpedo Moscow players
FC Baltika Kaliningrad players
Living people
Russian Premier League players
FC Spartak Vladikavkaz players
FC Ufa players
FC Tom Tomsk players
FC Aktobe players
Russian expatriate footballers
Expatriate footballers in Kazakhstan
Association football forwards
FC Elista players
FC Dynamo Bryansk players
FC Dynamo Stavropol players
FC Volga Ulyanovsk players